Mecum Dealmakers is an American reality program airing on NBCSN. The series takes a behind-the-scenes look at Mecum Auctions, America's biggest collectable car auction facility. Each episode features a specific auction, focusing on the unique and collectable automobiles in each auction. The program features Mecum Auctions founder Dana Mecum and son Frank.

Broadcast
The first eleven episode season premiered on July 31, 2014 on NBCSN. The second season of seven episodes premiered on July 30, 2015. The series was rebroadcast on Velocity.

Internationally, the series premiered in Australia on April 2, 2015 on Discovery Turbo.

Episodes

Season 1 (2014)

Season 2 (2015)

References

External links
 
 https://www.mecum.com
 

2014 American television series debuts
English-language television shows
NBCSN shows